Mevkuž is a settlement in the Municipality of Gorje in the Upper Carniola region of Slovenia.

The local church is dedicated to Saint Nicholas.

References

External links
Mevkuž on Geopedia

Populated places in the Municipality of Gorje